John Metchie III (born July 18, 2000) is a Canadian gridiron football wide receiver for the Houston Texans of the National Football League (NFL). He played college football at Alabama, winning the Jon Cornish Trophy twice prior to being drafted by the Texans in the second round of the 2022 NFL Draft. Metchie would sit out his rookie season after being diagnosed with acute promyelocytic leukemia.

Early years
Metchie was born in Taiwan to a Nigerian father and Taiwanese mother on July 18, 2000. His family moved to Accra, Ghana, when he was one before moving to Brampton, Ontario, Canada, with his mother and four brothers while his father remained in Ghana. He then moved to the United States to attend St. James School in Hagerstown, Maryland. Metchie spent a post-graduate year at the Peddie School in Hightstown, New Jersey, before committing to play college football at the University of Alabama.

College career
Metchie played in all 13 games as a freshman at Alabama in 2019 and had four catches for 23 yards. He became one of Alabama's top three receivers his sophomore year in 2020 racking up 916 yards on 55 receptions with six touchdowns. He was the first receiver to win the Jon Cornish Trophy as the top Canadian in NCAA football in the 2020 season. As a junior in 2021, Metchie recorded 96 receptions for 1,142 yards and eight touchdowns before tearing his ACL in the 2021 SEC Championship Game. Metchie was again named the recipient of the Jon Cornish Trophy, joining Nathan Rourke as the only two-time winners.

Professional career

Metchie was selected by the Houston Texans in the second round (44th overall) of the 2022 NFL Draft. He was also selected by the BC Lions in the seventh round (59th overall) of the 2022 CFL Draft before signing a four-year contract, worth $8 million, with the Texans on May 14, 2022. In July, Metchie announced he would sit out his rookie season after being diagnosed with acute promyelocytic leukemia.

Personal life
His older brother, Royce Metchie, is also a professional football player.

References

External links
Houston Texans bio
Alabama Crimson Tide bio

2000 births
Living people
Canadian players of American football
Gridiron football people from Ontario
Sportspeople from Brampton
American football wide receivers
Alabama Crimson Tide football players
Taiwanese players of American football
Houston Texans players
Canadian people of Taiwanese descent
Canadian sportspeople of Nigerian descent
Taiwanese people of Nigerian descent
Jon Cornish Trophy winners